Columbia High School a public high school in the St. Andrews area of Columbia, South Carolina, United States. Columbia High School was originally housed in the former Columbia Female Academy (established 1816) at 1323 Washington Street at the corner with Marion Street. This building was leased to the Richland County Commissioners of Schools in 1884. The school became Columbia's first public high school in 1895 as the Washington Street School. The original Columbia High School building was constructed in 1915 on that site. The current building was constructed in 1975.

Activities

Athletics
Columbia High fields teams in the following sports:
Football
Volleyball
Tennis
Soccer
Basketball
Softball
Baseball
Track & field
Wrestling
Cross country
Cheerleading
Color guard

Notable alumni

Weston Adams – former United States Ambassador, managing partner of the Weston Adams Law Firm and film producer.
Kimberly Clarice Aiken – former Miss America (1994)
Joseph Bernardin – former Cardinal for the Catholic Church
Bob Bowman – swimming coach, who is best known as the coach of Michael Phelps
Randy Brooks – actor
Mary Lillian Ellison – former professional wrestler known by her ring name "The Fabulous Moolah" 
Kirkman Finlay Jr. – former Mayor of Columbia, South Carolina
William Price Fox – American novelist
Angelo King – former National Football League (NFL) linebacker
Craig Melvin – journalist

References

External links
Website

Bibliography
Maxey, Russell The Columbia High School Story, Palmetto Publishing Company, Columbia, SC, 1984. 
Schools in Columbia, South Carolina
Public high schools in South Carolina